Long John may refer to:

People with the nickname or stage name
 Long John Baldry (John William Baldry, 1941-2005), British-born Canadian blues singer and voice actor
 Giorgio Chinaglia (1947-2012), Italian footballer
 John Daly (golfer) (born 1966), American golfer
 John Ewing (baseball) (1863-1895), American professional baseball player
 Long John Hunter (John Thurman Hunter, Jr., 1931-2016), American guitarist, singer and songwriter
 Raymond Martorano (1927-2002), Italian-American mobster 
 Long John Nebel (John Zimmerman, 1911-1978), American radio host
 John Reilly (baseball) (1858-1937), American baseball player
 John Sorrell (ice hockey) (1906-1984), Canadian ice hockey player
 John Wentworth (Illinois politician) (1815-1888), American politician and newspaper editor

Other uses
 Long John Silver, a fictional character in the novel Treasure Island
 Long John (bull), #58x, (2010–2017) a world champion bucking bull
 Long John (doughnut), a bar-shaped pastry
 Long John (bicycle), a freight bicycle
 Long John, a blended Scotch whisky

See also
 
 
 Long underwear, also called long johns
 Long John Silver (disambiguation)
 Tillandsia 'Long John', a hybrid plant cultivar

Lists of people by nickname